Pflugerville High School is a public high school located in Pflugerville, Texas.

In 2017, the school was a Top-10 Finalist in Reader's Digest Nicest Places in America contest.

Athletics

List of sports
 Baseball 
 Basketball, Boys
 Basketball, Girls
 Cross Country
 Football
 Golf, Fall
 Golf, Spring
 Marching Band
 Powerlifting
 Soccer, Boys
 Soccer, Girls
 Softball
 Swimming 
 Tennis, Fall
 Tennis, Spring
 Track and Field
 Volleyball
 Wrestling

History

Football
During the 2013 NFL Draft, Pflugerville High School graduate Zaviar Gooden and Alex Okafor were drafted by the Tennessee Titans and Arizona Cardinals respectively. In the 2014 NFL Draft, IK Enemkpali was drafted by the New York Jets. In the 2015 NFL Draft, Tyrus Thompson was drafted by Minnesota Vikings.

55-game winning streak

From 1958 until 1962, Pflugerville won 55 consecutive games. At the time, it was both a State and National record. The Streak ended with a 12-6 loss to Holland in the 1962 Bi-District round of the playoffs. In 1964, Pflugerville's national winning streak record was broken by Jefferson City, Missouri.

In 1958 and 1959, PHS fielded Eight-Man football teams and played in the Class B division until 1967, which were not allowed to play to a State Championship. This is why Pflugerville is only credited with 34 wins on the all-time consecutive win chart. However, they are in actually, in 2nd Place as of 2005.

The Panthers compiled 5 District Championships, 2 Bi-District Championships, and 4 Regional Championships.

Through those five seasons, the Panthers scored 2,585 points; allowed just 256 and recorded 31 shutouts of their opponents.

The record for most consecutive victories is now held by De La Salle High School of California with 151 from 1992 to 2004. 

Their streak ended with the first game of the 2004 season against Bellevue High from Washington state. 

The Texas State record is now held by Celina, which won 68 games from 1998-2002.  Pflugerville still ranks #2 All-Time in the State of Texas.

Kuempel Stadium
The 10,000-capacity Kuempel Stadium, the current home of the Panthers in Football, Soccer and Track & Field.

Through the 2004 season, Kuempel Stadium has had a natural grass playing surface.  However, on February 5, 2005 voters approved a multimillion-dollar bond package which included funds to upgrade to the new style of artificial turf.  Similar surfaces are used at RRISD Stadium and at Dragon Stadium as well as NFL and College teams throughout the Nation.  Construction was finished prior to the start of the 2005 season.

A plaque outside the entrance explains the name origin:

Dedicated October 1986

Named for Charles and H. L. "Hub" Kuempel, both graduates of Pflugerville High School, who returned and served the Pflugerville schools for a combined 49 years. In the late '50s and early '60s they coached PHS to 55 consecutive football victories.

At that time, this was a State and National Record and still stands as the Texas state record.

 In 2007, the Pflugerville High School football team reached the Texas 5A State Championship game but lost to Katy High School from Katy, Texas.
 The TV Series Friday Night Lights was originally filmed using the stadium, and the team took the name of Dillon Panthers after Pflugerville Panthers and used many of the mascot items for the show.

The Pfield

This stadium was created through 2016–2017 and opened in the 2017–18 school year, but was used for the preceding 4th of July. It is used for the District's Football, and not all of Pflugerville's games, for which Kuempel Stadium is used instead.

It is used by all four high schools in the Pflugerville District.

In the news
 2007
 On the morning of September 11, 2007, a teenager in Pflugerville was arrested in connection to terrorist threats made against Pflugerville High School that were posted on the website 4chan.
 2010
  Yearbook causes controversy
 2012
  Student brings gun to Pflugerville High School
  Unauthorized person
 Pflugerville ISD makes history, gives domestic partnerships benefits
 2013
 Report of weapon delays Pflugerville High release
 2017
 On the morning of February 7, 2017, a 'suspicious object' was set on fire in a bathroom, leading to the school's evacuation. The student involved was charged with arson and arrested.

Staff

Principals
 1981 to 2008 – Larry Bradley  
 2008 to 2017 – Kirk Wrinkle 
 2017 to 2021 – Ameka Hunt
 2021 to current – Zackary Kleypas

Notable people
 Nate Minchey – professional baseball player
 Mario Ramos (1994) – professional baseball player
 Micah Lawrence (2008) – U.S. Olympic athlete 
Garrett Lindholm (2006) – American football placekicker
 Zaviar Gooden (2008) – American football player currently a Free Agent
 Alex Okafor – American football player
Ikemefuna Enemkpali – NFL football player
 Michael Johnson – NFL football player
 Tyrus Thompson, American football player

References

External links
GreatSchools.net

1973 establishments in Texas
Educational institutions established in 1973
High schools in Travis County, Texas
Public high schools in Texas